Nevin Birsa may refer to:
 Birsa Munda (1875–1900), Indian independence movement leader
 Nevin Birsa (Slovene poet) (1947–2003), Slovene poet